Sees Creek (also called Sees Branch) is a stream in Marion County in the U.S. state of Missouri.

Sees Creek has the name of William See, a pioneer citizen.

See also
List of rivers of Missouri

References

Rivers of Marion County, Missouri
Rivers of Missouri